Gautami Tadimalla is an Indian actor, costume designer, and producer who works mainly in Tamil, Telugu. She has acted in Tamil, Telugu, Malayalam, Kannada, and Hindi movies. She is an acclaimed costume designer and won the 2008 Vijay Award for Best Costume Designer for her work on the Tamil movie Dasavatharam.

Films

Television 
TV serials
 Chinna Chinna Aasai
 Indira (Sun TV) as  Indira ; 2002–2004
 Abirami (Kalaignar TV) as Abhirami/Saranya/Nandha ; 2010
Reality shows as Judge
 Ugram Ujjawalam (Mazhavil Manorama)
 Dance Jodi Dance  (Zee Tamil)
 Dance Jodi Dance (season 2)  (Zee Tamil)

Other shows as Guest
 Badai Bungalow (Asianet)
 Onnum Onnum Moonu (Mazhavil Manorama)
 Laughing Villa (Surya TV)
Alitho Saradaga (ETV)

Online show
 Anbudan Gautami Season 1&2 as Host and Season 3 (2021-Ongoing)

References

Indian filmographies